The Symposium on Combinatorial Search (SoCS) in an international conference aimed at bringing together 
researchers and all others interested in all fields that use combinatorial search, including artificial intelligence, planning, robotics, constraint programming, meta-reasoning, operations research, navigation, and bioinformatics.

In addition, the conference tries to strengthen the relation with other important areas of artificial intelligence. In recent years, there has been an emphasis on robotics, automated planning, big data, and meta-reasoning.

SoCS is also an unincorporated non-profit volunteer association organized in New Hampshire (USA),
with the purpose of promoting the study and understanding of combinatorial search and heuristic search algorithms among the public through the organization of scientific meetings, publications, tutorials, and other public scientific and educational activities.

The next SoCS event (SoCS 2020) is planned to be held in cyberspace.

History 
The First Symposium on Combinatorial Search was held in Chicago (Illinois, USA) in 2008 as a result of various workshops that were held in previous conferences, mainly IJCAI, AAAI and ICAPS. Since then, it has been held every year, always in association with a larger event.

Although the first three symposia were held in the United States, SoCS rotates around the world, being co-located near whichever major conference the organizers target. Papers from the first two symposia (2008 and 2009) are available on the web.  Since SoCS 2010, the symposium has published with AAAI Press and all accepted papers can be found in the AAAI Digital Library.

List of past conferences

References

External links 
 International Symposium on Combinatorial Search (SoCS) with information of all SoCS events

Organizations based in New Hampshire